Resande Man was a Swedish warship that sank on 26 November 1660 in the Stockholm archipelago. 25 people survived the sinking while 37 people died. The ship was 27 meters long and had 22 cannons.

The wreck was thought to have been found in 2009. New reports that the wreck was found came in May 2012.

References

External links
 

Shipwrecks in the Baltic Sea
Maritime incidents in 1660
Age of Sail naval ships of Sweden
1660s ships
Shipwrecks of Sweden